Lucido Maria Parocchi (13 August 1833 – 15 January 1903) was an Italian cardinal of the Roman Catholic Church who served as Secretary of the Supreme Sacred Congregation of the Holy Office from 5 August 1896 until his death.

Biography
Lucido Maria Parocchi was born in Mantua as the son of Antonio Parocchi, a rich miller, and Genoveva Soresina. He was educated at the Seminary of Mantua, and later at the Collegio Romano, where he was awarded a doctorate in theology on 5 September 1856.
 
He was ordained to the priesthood on 17 May 1856, by Costantino Patrizi Naro, Cardinal Vicar General of Rome. He returned to the diocese of Mantua, where he worked as a professor of ecclesiastical history, moral theology, and canon law at its seminary. He was created Domestic prelate of His Holiness on 10 March 1871.

He became Bishop of Pavia in 1871, being consecrated on 5 November of that year in the church of Santissima Trinità al Monte Pincio by Cardinal Patrizi Naro. He was promoted to the metropolitan see of Bologna on 12 March 1877.

Parocchi was created Cardinal-Priest of San Sisto Vecchio by Pope Pius in the consistory of 22 June 1877. He participated in the conclave of 1878 that elected Pope Leo XIII. He resigned pastoral government of the archdiocese on 28 June 1882. He opted for the title of Cardinal-Priest of Santa Croce in Gerusalemme on 24 March 1884. He was appointed as Camerlengo of the Sacred College of Cardinals by Pope Leo on 1 June 1888. He was elected to the order of bishops and the suburbicarian see of Albano on 24 May 1889. Pope Leo appointed him as Secretary of the Supreme Sacred Congregation of the Holy Office on 5 August 1896, a post he held until his death. He opted for the suburbicarian see of Porto e Santa Rufina in 1896. He died in 1903.  

1833 births
1903 deaths
Clergy from Mantua
20th-century Italian cardinals
Cardinals created by Pope Pius IX
Cardinal-bishops of Albano
Cardinal-bishops of Porto
Roman Catholic archbishops of Bologna
Bishops of Pavia
19th-century Italian cardinals
19th-century Italian Roman Catholic archbishops
20th-century Italian Roman Catholic archbishops
Cardinal Vicars
Members of the Holy Office